Ones and Sixes is the eleventh studio album by Low, released on September 11, 2015. It was co-produced by the band and engineer BJ Burton, at Justin Vernon's April Base Studios in Eau Claire, Wisconsin. Sub Pop released a promotional video for 'No Comprende' in advance of the album's release, on June 23, 2015. The album also features contributions from Wilco drummer Glenn Kotche. The album artwork was created by artist Peter Liversidge. The album's lyrics were nominated for an AML Award.

Composition
Musically, a shift made itself evident to critics reviewing Ones and Sixes, reaping generally positive assessments. While its predecessor The Invisible Way saw Jeff Tweedy of Wilco handling the production duties, Ones and Sixes would feature Bon Iver associate B.J. Burton producing alongside Low for the first time. He went on to produce their albums Double Negative and Hey What.

The change in technical personnel would result in the trio's sound being "pushed, pulled and wrangled out of shape to devastating effect," "striking a balance between their majestic, slow-moving melancholy and harsher experimental noise."

Track listing

Charts

References

2015 albums
Albums produced by BJ Burton
Low (band) albums
Sub Pop albums